Paduka Sri Sultan Muhammad Jiwa Zainal Adilin Mu'adzam Shah II ibni al-Marhum Sultan Ahmad Tajuddin Halim Shah I (1699 – 23 September 1778; also spelt Sultan Muhammad Jiwa Zain al-‘Adilan Mu’azzam Shah) was the 19th Sultan of Kedah. He reigned from 1710/1723 to 1778 and is widely known as the founder of Alor Setar and many current landmarks in the city are attributed to him.

He went on pilgrimage to Jambi and Palembang, where he met the Arab religious teacher Shaikh Abdul Jalil, then journeyed with him to Java and India. He returned to the mainland from his exile in Langkawi and formally was installed at the Istana Bukit Pinang in May 1710. He then transferred his capital to Alor Star on 20 December 1735.

Alor Setar was founded in 1735 by Sultan Muhammad Jiwa and was Kedah’s eighth administrative centre since the establishment of the Kedah Sultanate in 1136. The earlier administrative centres were located in Kota Bukit Meriam, Kota Sungai Emas, Kota Siputeh, Kota Naga, Kota Sena, Kota Indera Kayangan and Kota Bukit Pinang.

After founding the city, Sultan Muhammad Jiwa went on to build his palace, Istana Kota Setar. The original building was a wooden structure which had undergone demolitions several times due to attacks by the Bugis (1770) and the Siamese (1821). The current concrete building was completed during the reign of Sultan Ahmad Tajuddin Mukarram Shah in the mid-19th century.

This palace is also renowned as the Istana Pelamin Palace when the space of the palace was extended to add a pavilion and several rooms when Sultan Abdul Hamid Halim Shah wanted to marry off his five princes and princesses. After 1941, this palace was used as a school and an office for several organizations including the office for the Kedah chapter of St John's Ambulance and the Scout movements. On 25 July 1983, this palace was declared the Kedah Royal Museum.

Another structure attributed to Sultan Muhammad Jiwa was the Balai Besar (Grand Audience Hall). Initially the function of the building was as the Balai Rong Seri or Balai Penghadapan (audience hall), that was situated at the back area of the Istana Kota Setar complex. The pillars, roofs and floors were made of wood and still stands to this day.

Balai Nobat was also built by Sultan Muhammad Jiwa upon founding of Alor Setar. The 18 metre-tall and 5 metre-wide three-tiered octagonal tower's purpose was to keep all the royal musical instruments including the serunai (wooden flute), nafiri, gendang (drum) and gong (also known as a nobat).

Kedah achieved its greatest extent during his reign, its borders stretched from Terang in the north to Krian in the south.

External links
 List of Sultans of Kedah

1778 deaths
Year of birth unknown
18th-century Sultans of Kedah
City founders